Eisenhüttenstadt (literally "ironworks city" in German;) is a town in the Oder-Spree district of the state of Brandenburg, Germany, on the border with Poland. East Germany founded the city in 1950. It was known as Stalinstadt (Stalinměsto) between 1953 and 1961.

Geography
The municipal area is situated on a sandy terrace in the Berlin-Warsaw glacial valley (Urstromtal). It is bounded by the Oder river to the east, which since 1945 has formed the German–Polish border. Eisenhüttenstadt is the eastern terminus of the Oder–Spree Canal. Eisenhüttenstadt is served by the Berlin–Wrocław railway line.

The town comprises the districts of Diehlo, Fürstenberg (Oder), and Schönfließ.

History

The town was built near the historic village of Fürstenberg (Oder) which was founded in 1251. After the Peace of Prague in 1635, Fürstenberg and Lower Lusatia became part of the Electorate of Saxony, and in 1815 it was transferred to Prussia. In 1925, a port on the Oder was created.

The present-day town was founded as a socialist model city in 1950 (initially named Stalinstadt after Joseph Stalin) following a decision by the East German Socialist Unity Party (SED), alongside a new steel mill combine located west of the historic town of Fürstenberg (Oder). A few years before the new town was established, a bridge over the Oder river had been constructed, the earlier one having been destroyed by retreating Wehrmacht forces in February 1945, near the end of World War II.

The population grew rapidly in the 1950s and 1960s. In 1961, during de-Stalinization, the town was renamed Eisenhüttenstadt. After German reunification in 1990, the state-owned steel works were privatized, and most of its 12,000 employees lost their jobs. Thereafter the factory employed around 2,500 workers. The town experienced a steep decline in population, from just over 50,000 to under 30,000.

Demography

Architecture
The first design for the new residential quarter was developed by the modernist and Bauhaus architect, Franz Ehrlich, in August 1950. His modernist plan, which laid out a dispersed town landscape along functional lines, was rejected by the Ministry for Reconstruction. The same happened to the plan presented by the architects Kurt Junghanns and Otto Geiler. The plan that was ultimately realized was developed by Kurt Walter Leucht.

Twin towns – sister cities

Eisenhüttenstadt is twinned with:
 Dimitrovgrad, Bulgaria (1958)
 Drancy, France (1963)
 Głogów, Poland (1972)
 Saarlouis, Germany (1986), first East and West German town twinning

Notable people
Eisenhüttenstadt is the birthplace of:
 Udo Beyer (born 1955), shot put, Olympian champion  1976 and holder of world record
 Hans-Georg Beyer (born 1956), handball player, olympic winner 1980
 Detlef Gerstenberg (1957–1993), hammer thrower, competitor in 1980 Summer Olympics
 Frank Schaffer (born 1958), athlete, medal winner in 1980 Summer Olympics
 Katharina Bullin (born 1959), volleyball player
 Gisela Beyer (born 1960), athlete
 Hendrik Reiher (born 1962), rowing cox, medal winner in multiple Olympic Games
 Torsten René Gutsche (born 1968), sprint canoer, competitor in two Summer Olympic Games; 1992 winner of the Bambi Award
 Sven Helbig (born 1968), producer, musician
 Kathrin Boron (born 1969), sculler, competitor in multiple Olympic Games, gold medalist in several World Rowing Championships
 Sören Lausberg (born 1969), retired track cyclist, competitor in two Summer Olympic Games
 Paul van Dyk (born 1971), DJ, composer and music producer
Katja Adler (born 1974), politician
 Amadeus Wallschläger (born 1985), footballer
 Roger Kluge (born 1986), racing cyclist, silver medal winner in 2008 Summer Olympics
 Florian Müller (born 1986), footballer

Other personalities associated with the city 

 Bernhard Lösener (1890–1952), jurist
 Rudolf Bahro (1935–1997), regime critic and author of the book  The alternative. A critique of real-existing socialism., spent his school days in the city
 Tamara Bunke (1937–1967), fellow combatant of Che Guevara in Bolivia, took her Abitur (school leaving examination) in Eisenhüttenstadt
 Rolf Henrich (born 1944), lawyer, first signatory of the Founding Congress of the New Forum

References

External links 

 Official municipal website 
 EKO Stahl AG
 The local encyclopedia Wikihüttenstadt

Localities in Oder-Spree
Socialist planned cities
Geography of East Germany
Populated places established in 1950
1950 establishments in East Germany
De-Stalinization